Sarah Kennedy is British radio broadcaster.

Sarah Kennedy may also refer to:

 Sarah Kennedy (actress), semi-regular panelist on US TV show Match Game
 Sarah Kennedy (née Gurling), widow of British Liberal Democrat politician Charles Kennedy
 Sarah Ann Kennedy, British voice actress